Wyoming Township is located in Lee County, Illinois. As of the 2010 census, its population was 1,376 and it contained 589 housing units. Wyoming Township was originally named Paw Paw Township, but the name was changed on May 14, 1850.

Geography

Demographics

References

External links
US Census
City-data.com
Cook County Official Site
Illinois State Archives

Townships in Lee County, Illinois
Populated places established in 1850
Townships in Illinois